The following lists events that happened during 2015 in Madagascar.

Incumbents
President: Hery Rajaonarimampianina 
Prime Minister: Roger Kolo (until January 17), Jean Ravelonarivo (starting January 17)

Events

 
2010s in Madagascar
Madagascar
Madagascar
Years of the 21st century in Madagascar